The Octorara Area School District is a small, rural–urban fringe, public school district serving Parkesburg, Atglen, Christiana, West Sadsbury Township, Sadsbury Township (Lancaster County), West Fallowfield Township, Highland Township, and Londonderry Township in Pennsylvania.

The district encompasses approximately 93 square miles, with access along Pennsylvania Route 41. Just 10 miles south of U.S. Route 30 and 9 miles north of U.S. Route 1, the district is within 30 miles of Lancaster; Reading; and Wilmington, DE.

As of 2009, the Octorara Area School District employed 203 professional staff and 157 support staff.  Within the faculty, 31 have over 20 years of experience, 161 have a master's degree or equivalent, and 5 have Doctorate degrees. The district consists of three elementary schools, and a combined middle school and high school. The Primary Learning Center includes grades K-2, Elementary School grades 3–4, Intermediate School grades 5–6, Junior-Senior High School grades 7–12.

Academic achievement

Graduation rate
Effective with the 2009–2010 school year, the Pennsylvania Department of Education (PDE) began implementation of a new methodology to calculate graduation rates for all public high schools, comprehensive Career and Technical Centers (CTCs) and charter schools that graduate students from 12th grade. Octorara Area School District's 2013-2-14 graduation rate was 91.88%, compared to the state average of 85.45%.

PSSA results
The Pennsylvania System of School Assessment, also known as PSSA, measures how well students have achieved in reading, mathematics, science and writing according to Pennsylvania's academic standards.  By using these standards, educators, parents and administrators can evaluate their students' strengths and weaknesses to increase students' achievement scores.

Reading - Proficient or Above
2012 - 71%, Pennsylvania - 73.8%

Math - Proficient or Above
2012 - 78%, Pennsylvania - 80%

Science - Proficient or Above
2012 - 86.9%, Pennsylvania - 82.3%

Writing - Proficient or Above
2012 - 57.3%, Pennsylvania - 64.2%

Graduate Data and statistics
The Pennsylvania Department of Education, Division of Data Quality, provides a compilation of statistical information covering high school graduates in Pennsylvania's public schools. Pennsylvania's public high schools with enrollment in grade 12; including secondary ungraded, provide the graduate data through the Pennsylvania Information Management System (PIMS).

Graduates Public 2013-14
Total Postsecondary Bound - 72.28%
 Total College Bound - 71.2%
 2- or 4- Year College or University - 63.04%
 Specialized Associate Degree-Granting Institution- 8.15%
 Non-Degree Granting Postsecondary - 1.09%

Schools
Octorara Primary Learning Center
Octorara Elementary School
Octorara Intermediate School
Octorara Junior-Senior High School

References

External links
Octorara Area School District

School districts established in 1956
School districts in Chester County, Pennsylvania
1956 establishments in Pennsylvania